Trilogy of Terror may refer to:

Films
Trilogy of Terror (Trilogia do Terror),  1968 Brazilian horror film by José Mojica Marins
Trilogy of Terror, 1975 American horror film
Trilogy of Terror II, 1996 American horror film (sequel)

Other
Trilogy of Terror (Blind Illusion album), the second demo album by thrash metal band Blind Illusion